Keya Paha County is a county in the U.S. state of Nebraska. As of the 2010 United States Census, the population was 824. Its county seat is Springview.

In the Nebraska license plate system, Keya Paha County is represented by the prefix 82 (it had the 82nd-largest number of vehicles registered in the county when the license plate system was established in 1922).

History
The name "Keya Paha" is taken from the Dakota language; literally translated, it means "turtle hill". The Dakota name for a set of small hills was given to the county and to the Keya Paha River, which runs through it.

All land north of the Keya Paha River (which includes a small portion of Keya Paha County and most of neighboring Boyd County) was not originally part of Nebraska at the time of statehood, but was transferred from Dakota Territory in 1882.

Keya Paha County was organized in 1884 of land partitioned from Brown County.

Geography
Keya Paha County lies on the northern boundary of Nebraska, abutting the state of South Dakota. The county's terrain consists of low rolling hills, whose level areas are used for agriculture, including center pivot irrigation. The Keya Paha River flows east-southeastward through the northeastern part of the county, while the Niobrara River flows eastward along the south county line.

Keya Paha County is located in Nebraska's Outback region.

Major highways

  U.S. Highway 183
  Nebraska Highway 7
  Nebraska Highway 12
  Nebraska Highway 137

Adjacent counties

 Tripp County, South Dakota - north
 Gregory County, South Dakota - northeast
 Boyd County - east
 Holt County - southeast
 Rock County - south
 Brown County - south
 Cherry County - west
 Todd County, South Dakota - northwest

National protected area
 Niobrara National Scenic River (part)

Demographics

As of the 2000 United States Census, there were 983 people, 409 households, and 292 families in the county. The population density was 1.3 people per square mile (0.5/km2); there were 548 housing units at an average density of 0.7 per square mile (0.3/km2). The racial makeup of the county was 99.39% White, 0.20% Native American, and 0.41% from two or more races; 3.87% of the population were Hispanic or Latino of any race; 46.7% were of German, 10.6% English, 9.8% American, 7.0% Irish and 6.0% Swedish ancestry.

There were 409 households, out of which 24.90% had children under the age of 18 living with them, 64.30% were married couples living together, 4.40% had a female householder with no husband present, and 28.60% were non-families. 26.20% of all households were made up of individuals, and 13.90% had someone living alone who was 65 years of age or older. The average household size was 2.40 and the average family size was 2.91.

The county population contained 23.80% under the age of 18, 6.70% from 18 to 24, 23.40% from 25 to 44, 25.40% from 45 to 64, and 20.70% who were 65 years of age or older. The median age was 42 years. For every 100 females there were 101.40 males.  For every 100 females age 18 and over, there were 101.90 males.

The median income for a household in the county was $24,911, and the median income for a family was $28,287. Males had a median income of $18,750 versus $19,107 for females. The per capita income for the county was $11,860. About 22.40% of families and 26.90% of the population were below the poverty line, including 34.30% of those under age 18 and 18.80% of those age 65 or over.

Politics
As of 2008, Keya Paha County was the most Republican of all the counties in Nebraska, with 82.7% of its 707 registered voters registered as Republicans. The last Democratic Presidential candidate to win the county was Woodrow Wilson in 1916. In 1994, Ben Nelson was the last Democratic gubernatorial candidate to carry the county.

Communities

Villages 

 Burton
 Springview (county seat)

Unincorporated communities 

 Brocksburg
 Jamison
 Meadville
 Mills
 Norden
 Riverview

See also
 National Register of Historic Places listings in Keya Paha County, Nebraska

References

 
Nebraska counties
1884 establishments in Nebraska
Populated places established in 1884